The Andaman smooth-hound (Mustelus andamanensis) is a type of smooth-hound of the family Triakidae, found in Eastern Indian Ocean (Myanmar, Thailand, and Andaman Sea).

The Andaman smooth-hound can be distinguished from its congeners from a number of characteristics, such as the absence of small white spots along lateral lines and on dorsal surface, the absence of white margin on the first dorsal fin, blackish second dorsal fin, and the presence of subdivided palatoquadrate.

References 

andamanensis
Fish described in 2021